1978 Women's Nordic Football Championship was the fifth edition of the Women's Nordic Football Championship tournament. It was held from 7 July to 9 July in Denmark. This was the first time as Norway joined the tournament. 

The match between Norway and Sweden on 7 July was the first ever international for Norway women's national football team.

Standings

Results

Goalscorers 
1 goal
  Anette Börjesson
  Britta Ehmsen
  Susanne Erlandsson
  Kirsten Fabrin
  Anne Grete Holst
  Kari Nielsen
  Inger Pedersen
  Fridel Riggelsen
  Lone Smidt Nielsen
  Tuula Sundman
  Karin Ödlund

Sources 
Nordic Championships (Women) 1978 Rec.Sport.Soccer Statistics Foundation
Landsholdsdatabasen Danish Football Association
Lautela, Yrjö & Wallén, Göran: Rakas jalkapallo — Sata vuotta suomalaista jalkapalloa, p. 418. Football Association of Finland / Teos Publishing 2007. .

References 

Women's Nordic Football Championship
1978–79 in European football
1978 in women's association football
1978
Women's football in Denmark
1978 in Norwegian football
1978 in Finnish football
1978 in Swedish football
1978 in Danish football
July 1978 sports events in Europe
1978 in Danish women's sport